Dyoma (Dim) is a rural locality (a village) in Arovsky Selsoviet, Chishminsky District, Bashkortostan, Russia. The population was 77 as of 2010. There are 23 streets.

Geography 
Dyoma is located 27 km east of Chishmy (the district's administrative centre) by road. Lekarevka is the nearest rural locality.

References 

Rural localities in Chishminsky District